Archibald Simson, born in 1564, was the son of Andrew Simson.  He was educated at University of St Andrews, graduating with an MA in 1585. He became assistant minister to his father at Dalkeith in 1586. Archibald was clerk to the Presbytery on 10 October 1588. He was ordained on 3 June 1591. In 1605 he reached Aberdeen too late to take part in the General Assembly of Aberdeen, which met in defiance of the royal prohibition, but affirmed his adhesion to all its Acts. He was summoned before the Privy Council, and dismissed on promising more moderate behaviour in future. On 27 June 1617 he signed, in name of fifty-four others, a protest against a proposed Act of Parliament which sought to make the King supreme ruler of the Church. The bill was withdrawn, but Simson was summoned before the Court of High Commission, deprived of his charge, and confined to the town of Aberdeen. On acknowledging his offence he was allowed to return home. He was ordered to "re-compear" before the same Court, on 7 June 1620, but escaped this through the intercession of William, Earl of Morton. He died in December 1628.

Life
Archibald Simson, Scottish divine, was born in 1564, most likely in Dunbar, to Andrew Simson and Violet Simson. His mother, Violet, was the sister of Patrick Adamson, archbishop of St. Andrews. Patrick Simson was his brother. Archibald graduated from the University of St. Andrews in 1585, and in the following year became assistant to his father at Dalkeith in Midlothian. On his father's death, he succeeded in the charge. He acquired some fame as a poet and attracted the notice of Sir John Maitland of Thirlestane, Lord Chancellor of Scotland. Through his good offices, Dalkeith was erected into a parish in 1592.

In the conflict between church and state Simson was found on the side of the theocratic Presbyterians. In 1605 he arrived at Aberdeen too late to take part in the famous assembly which met in defiance of the royal wishes. But in company with the other ministers of his presbytery he declared, before departing homewards, his adhesion to all the acts of the late general assembly (Calderwood, Hist. of Scottish Kirk, vi. 444). For this, he was summoned before the privy council, but dismissed on promising more moderate behaviour in future (Reg. of Scottish Privy Council, 1604–7, pp. 105–6). Notwithstanding, he was one of those who crowded to support the five ministers who were brought to trial for treason in convening a general assembly in defiance of the king's prohibition (ib. p. 479; Calderwood, vi. 457).

In 1615 a murderous assault was made on him by one Robert Strachan of Musselburgh, for which the assailant had to do penance by standing on consecutive Sundays, clad in sackcloth and barefoot, in the churchyards of Dalkeith and Musselburgh (Reg. Scottish Privy Council, 1613–16, p. 368).

In 1617 Simson again placed himself in opposition to the crown. An act was brought forward in the Scottish parliament to the effect that ‘whatever his majesty should determine in the external government of the church, with the advice of the archbishops, bishops, and a competent number of the ministry, should have the force of law.’ The more independent of the clergy at once took fright, and on 27 June a meeting was hastily held, at which a protest was drawn up and signed by fifty-five of the ministers present, to the effect that the proposed statute was a violation of the fundamental rule of the Scottish church that changes of ecclesiastical law should be by the ‘advice and determination’ of general assemblies of the church. This document they resolved to present to the king; but to render the procedure as mild as possible, Peter Hewat was instructed to give James a copy which contained only the signature of Archibald Simson, who had acted as secretary of the meeting (ib. 1616–1619, pp. xlviii–lvii, 166; Calderwood, vii. 253, 256). In consequence, the bill was not proceeded with in parliament, but the weight of James's resentment fell on Simson and his confederates. On 1 July Simson was summoned before the court of high commission, deprived of his charge, and confined to the town of Aberdeen. On 11 December he acknowledged his offence and obtained restoration to his charge (Reg. of Scottish Privy Council, 1616–19, pp. 183, 280; Calderwood, vii. 257, 260, 286). A summons was sent for his ‘recompearance’ before the same court, on the 7th of June 1620, which he avoided through the intercession of William, earl of Morton (ib. vii. 444). He died in December 1628 at Dalkeith.

Family
He married: 
(1) Katherine Crichton (Edin. Beg., 1st Feb. 1604), who died before 10 Feb. 1607, and had issue — 
Christian;
Elizabeth; 
Jean
(2) before 26 Sept, 1607, Elizabeth Stewart, who survived him.

Works
Simson may be credited with ‘Ad Comitem Fermolodunensem Carmen,’ 1610, 4to, which has also been ascribed to his father, and he contributed a congratulatory poem in praise of James VI, entitled ‘Philomela Dalkeithiensis,’ to the ‘Muses' Welcome,’ Edinburgh, 1618, fol. He has also been identified with the author of ‘A Commentary or Exposition upon the Divine Second Epistle Generall written by St. Peter, plainly and pithily handled by A. Symson’ (London, 1632, 8vo), which is, however, more generally ascribed to Andrew Simson, the lexicographer, father of Andrew Simson (1638–1712) [q. v.], author of the ‘Large Description of Galloway.’ Archibald Simson's other works are: 1. ‘Christes Testament unfolded; or seauen godlie and learned Sermons on our Lords seauen last Words spoken on the Cross,’ Edinburgh, 1620, 8vo. 2. ‘Heptameron; the Seven Days; that is, Meditations and Prayers upon the Worke of the Lords Creation,’ St. Andrews, 1621, 8vo. 3. ‘Samsons seaven Lockes of Haire allegorically expounded,’ St. Andrews, 1621, 8vo. 4. ‘Hieroglyphica Animalium, Reptilium, Insectorum, &c. quæ in Scripturis Sacris inveniuntur,’ 2 tom. Edinburgh, 1622–4, 4to. 5. ‘A Sacred Septenarie, or a Godly Exposition of the seven Psalmes of Repentance,’ London, 1623, 8vo. 6. ‘Life of Patrick Simson’ [q. v.], printed in ‘Select Biographies,’ ed. W. K. Tweedie for the Wodrow Society, Edinburgh, 1845, 8vo.
The following works by him remain in manuscript in the Advocates' Library, Edinburgh: 1. ‘Historia Ecclesiastica Scotorum.’ 2. ‘Annales Ecclesiæ Scoticanæ’ (Sibbald, Repertory of Manuscripts in the Advocates' Library, p. 122).

Christ's Seven Words upon the Cross (1620)
Heptameron, the Seven Days (St Andrews, 1621)
Samson's Seaven Lockes of Haire (St Andrews, 1621)
Hieroglyphica Animalium Terrestrium, etc. (Edinburgh, 1622-4)
A Sacred Septenarie (1623)
Inducts Epistolas Petri (1632)
Philomela Dalkeithiensis, a congratulatory poem in praise, of His Majesty [James VI.] (in The Muses' Welcome, Edinburgh, 1618)
Letter to the High Commission, and an Apologetic (Orig. Lett., ii.)
A Sermon on John v. 35 {Select Biog., i.)
Life of Patrick Simson, ed. W. K. Tweedie, for the Wodrow Society, Edinburgh, 1845. Other works left in MSS., include Annales Ecclesio3 Scoticanoe and Historia Ecclesiastica Scotorum, now in the Advocates' Library (1558-1625)

Bibliography
[Scott's Fasti Eccl. Scot. I. i. 262; New Statistical Account, i. 518; Scot's Apologetic Narrative, p. 424.]
Act. Beet. Univ. St And.
Wodrow's MS. Biog., iv.
Edin. Presb. and Test. Beg.
Beg. Sec. Sig. and Assig. 
Lochleven Pap.
Booke of the Kirk
Spottiswood's, Row's, and Calderwood's Histories 
Scot's Stagg. State
Forbes's Records
Scot's Apol. Bel.
M'Crie's Melville, ii.
Orig. Lett.
New Stat. Account
Colleg. Ch. of Mid-Lothian
Acts Pari., iii. 
The Simsons

References
Citations

Sources

1564 births
1628 deaths
16th-century Scottish people
17th-century Scottish people